Jeffrey S. Bivins (born August 31, 1960) is an associate justice of the Supreme Court of Tennessee. He was appointed Associate Justice of the Tennessee Supreme Court by Governor Bill Haslam.

Education
Bivins graduated from Vanderbilt University Law School in 1986. He received a Bachelor of Arts degree, magna cum laude, in 1982 from East Tennessee State University, with a major in political science and a minor in criminal justice.

Judicial service
Bivins served as a judge on the Tennessee Court of Criminal Appeals from August 2011 until July 2014, after being appointed by Gov. Bill Haslam. Previously, Bivins was appointed to Circuit Court, 21st Judicial District in 2005 by Gov. Phil Bredesen and elected to an 8-year term in 2006.  He also previously served in a trial judge position from July 1999 through August 2000.

Bivins was sworn in as a member of the Tennessee Supreme Court in July 2014.

From 1986 to 1995, he served in private practice at the law firm of Boult, Cummings, Conners & Berry. He later served as Assistant Commissioner and General Counsel at the Tennessee Department of Personnel from 1996 to 1999 and again from 2000 to 2001. He returned to private practice in 2001 and served in that capacity till his appointment to the bench in 2005.

Community memberships
Bivins serves on the Board of Judicial Conduct. He also serves on the Executive Committee of the Tennessee Judicial Conference and is the President-Elect of the Conference. He also has served on the Tennessee Judicial Evaluation Commission. He is a member of the John Marshall American Inns of Court, having served as President from 2003-2008, and is a member of the Tennessee Bar Association and the Williamson County Bar Association. He also is a Fellow of the Tennessee Bar Foundation and the Nashville Bar Foundation. He is former member of the Williamson County Commission.

References

|-

1960 births
Living people
21st-century American judges
Chief Justices of the Tennessee Supreme Court
East Tennessee State University alumni
Justices of the Tennessee Supreme Court
People from Kingsport, Tennessee
Vanderbilt University Law School alumni